The women's football tournament at the 2004 Summer Olympics in Athens was held from 11 to 26 August 2004. The women's tournament was a full international tournament with no restrictions on age. The ten national teams involved in the tournament were required to register a squad of 18 players, including two goalkeepers. Additionally, teams could name a maximum of four alternate players, numbered from 19 to 22. The alternate list could contain at most three outfielders, as at least one slot was reserved for a goalkeeper. In the event of serious injury during the tournament, an injured player could be replaced by one of the players in the alternate list. Only players in these squads were eligible to take part in the tournament.

The age listed for each player is on 11 August 2004, the first day of the tournament. The numbers of caps and goals listed for each player do not include any matches played after the start of the tournament. The club listed is the club for which the player last played a competitive match prior to the tournament.

Group E

Japan
Head coach: Eiji Ueda

Japan named a squad of 18 players and 4 alternates for the tournament.

Nigeria
Head coach: Mabo Ismaila

Nigeria named a squad of 18 players and 4 alternates for the tournament.

Sweden
Head coach: Marika Domanski-Lyfors

Sweden named a squad of 18 players and 4 alternates for the tournament.

Group F

China PR
Head coach: Zhang Haitao

China PR named a squad of 18 players and 4 alternates for the tournament.

Germany
Head coach: Tina Theune-Meyer

Germany named a squad of 18 players and 4 alternates for the tournament.

Mexico
Head coach: Leonardo Cuéllar

Mexico named a squad of 18 players and 3 alternates for the tournament.

Group G

Australia
Head coach: Adrian Santrac

Australia named a squad of 18 players and 3 alternates for the tournament.

Brazil
Head coach: René Simões

Brazil named a squad of 18 players and 1 alternate for the tournament. During the tournament, Dayane replaced Kelly due to injury.

Greece
Head coach: Xanthi Konstantinidou

Greece named a squad of 18 players and 4 alternates for the tournament.

United States
Head coach: April Heinrichs

The United States named a squad of 18 players and 4 alternates for the tournament.

References

External links
 Olympic Football Tournaments Athens 2004 – Women, FIFA.com
 
 

Squads
2004